Teke is a bittern salt lake in Ualikhanov District, North Kazakhstan Region, Kazakhstan.

There are periodic deposits of salt on its shores, with extraction taking place in the summer. The salt of the lake contains magnesium chloride.

Geography
Teke is an endorheic lake located at the bottom of a depression in the southern part of the Ishim Plain, south of the Russian border. The lake is fed by snow, as well as groundwater. Lake Teke is surrounded by salt flats and a wide strip of solonchak soil.

The Taldysay and Tleusai are the main rivers flowing into the lake.

Flora and fauna
The west bank of Teke lake is visited yearly by large flocks of demoiselle cranes and Eurasian cranes during their autumn migration.

See also
List of lakes of Kazakhstan

References

External links

Lakes of Kazakhstan
Endorheic lakes of Asia
North Kazakhstan Region
West Siberian Plain